Adolf Fehr (born 23 October 1940) is a Liechtensteiner former alpine skier who competed in the 1960 Winter Olympics.

References

External links
 

1940 births
Living people
Liechtenstein male alpine skiers
Olympic alpine skiers of Liechtenstein
Alpine skiers at the 1960 Winter Olympics